is the first Jewelpet anime series created by Sanrio and Sega and animated by Studio Comet, directed by Nanako Sasaki. The series first aired on April 5, 2009 to March 28, 2010 on TV Osaka and TV Tokyo, replacing Onegai My Melody Kirara★ in its initial timeslot. The series also recently aired in Taiwan on YOYO TV, premiered as part the Boing programming block on the Telecinco television network in Spain in April 2010, aired in France via Teletoon France, also aired on Cartoon Network in the Philippines and aired on Canal Panda in Portugal in January 2011. It was also aired in Italy in February 2011 on Italia 1 and Hiro and it had reruns on Boing.

The first series focuses on Rinko Kougyoku and her Jewelpet Partner Ruby. The story focuses on collecting all the lost Jewelpets who were scattered in Takaragaseki City on Earth and foiling the plans of the Evil Dark Magic user Diana. As the series unfolds, the main heroines uncover new Jewelpets on their way while new relationships were being built through the characters. Near the half of the season Dian, another Jewelpet who can use Dark Magic awakens from his Jewel Charm State. And now the heroes have to face him and the havoc and chaos that will be caused in both Jewel Land and the Human World.

The series's music is composed by famous Video Game Composer Shiro Hamaguchi. Two songs were made for both the Opening and Ending themes of the series. The Opening theme is titled  by Yui Asaka and the ending theme is titled  by Horie Mitsuko.

DVD Releases of the anime were done by Marvelous AQL (Formerly Marvelous Entertainment) in Japan. All seventeen volumes have been released, with the first 16 has 3 episodes while the last volume having 4 episodes.

Episode list
NOTE: Some Episodes have text emoticons in the titles and the start of each episode repeats itself.

References

General
 http://www.tv-osaka.co.jp/jewelpet/

Specific